Casey Alexander (born June 8, 1972) is the head coach of the men's basketball team at Belmont University. He previously served as head coach at Stetson University and Lipscomb University.

Playing career
Alexander played college basketball at Belmont University, where he is now a member of the school's athletic hall of fame.

Coaching career
Immediately after graduation, Alexander joined the Belmont coaching staff under Rick Byrd, where he stayed for 16 seasons. He was a part of a coaching staff that reached four NCAA Tournaments. In 2011, Alexander got his first head coaching job at ASUN Conference rival Stetson, where he guided the Hatters to a 24–36 record in two seasons. On May 18, 2013, Alexander was named the head coach of Lipscomb, remaining in the A-Sun, and returning to his native Tennessee. In 2018, Alexander coached Lipscomb to its first Atlantic Sun title and first NCAA Division I Tournament appearance, and coached Lipscomb to its 1st regular season championship in 9 years in 2019. He was the 2018 recipient of the Skip Prosser Man of the Year Award. On April 10, 2019 he was named head coach for Belmont University, following former head coach Rick Byrd's decision to retire after 33 seasons.

Head coaching record

References

1972 births
Living people
American men's basketball coaches
American men's basketball players
Basketball coaches from Tennessee
Basketball players from Tennessee
Belmont Bruins men's basketball coaches
Belmont Bruins men's basketball players
Lipscomb Bisons men's basketball coaches
Sportspeople from Chattanooga, Tennessee
Stetson Hatters men's basketball coaches